Mycetoporus is a genus of crab-like rove beetles in the family Staphylinidae. There are at least 70 described species in Mycetoporus.

Species
These 78 species belong to the genus Mycetoporus:

 Mycetoporus adumbratus Wollaston, 1865 g
 Mycetoporus aequalis Thomson, 1868 g
 Mycetoporus altaicus Luze, 1901 g
 Mycetoporus ambiguus Luze, 1901 g
 Mycetoporus americanus Erichson, 1839 g
 Mycetoporus angularis Mulsant & Rey, 1854 g
 Mycetoporus baudueri Mulsant & Rey, 1875 g
 Mycetoporus bimaculatus Lacordaire, 1835 g
 Mycetoporus bipunctatus Campbell, 1991 g
 Mycetoporus bolitoboides Bernhauer g
 Mycetoporus boreellus Sahlberg, J., 1876 c g
 Mycetoporus bosnicus Luze, 1901 g
 Mycetoporus bruckii (Pandellé, 1869) g
 Mycetoporus christinae Palm, 1975 g
 Mycetoporus clavicornis (Stephens, 1832) g
 Mycetoporus confinis Rey, 1883 g
 Mycetoporus consors LeConte, 1863 g b
 Mycetoporus corpulentus Luze, 1901 g
 Mycetoporus dalmatinus Luze, 1901 g
 Mycetoporus debilis Mäklin, 1847 g
 Mycetoporus despectus Strand, 1969 g
 Mycetoporus discoidalis Sharp g
 Mycetoporus discoideus Wollaston, 1865 g
 Mycetoporus dispersus Schülke & Kocian, 2000 g
 Mycetoporus endogeus Coiffait, 1980 g
 Mycetoporus eppelsheimianus Fagel, 1968 g
 Mycetoporus erichsonanus Fagel, 1965 g
 Mycetoporus feloi Schulke, 2000 g
 Mycetoporus forticornis Fauvel, 1875 g
 Mycetoporus glaber (Sperk, 1835) g
 Mycetoporus gracilis Luze, 1901 g
 Mycetoporus horni Bernhauer & Schubert, 1916 g
 Mycetoporus ignidorsus Eppelsheim, 1880 g
 Mycetoporus imperialis Bernhauer, 1902 g
 Mycetoporus inaris Luze, 1901 g
 Mycetoporus inquisitus Casey, 1885 g
 Mycetoporus insulanus Luze, 1901 g
 Mycetoporus johnsoni Wollaston, 1860 g
 Mycetoporus jonicus Scheerpeltz, 1958 g
 Mycetoporus kahleni Schulke, 1996 g
 Mycetoporus lapponicus Thomson, 1861 g
 Mycetoporus lepidus (Gravenhorst, 1806) g
 Mycetoporus linderi Scheerpeltz, 1970 g
 Mycetoporus longulus Mannerheim, 1830 g
 Mycetoporus lucidulus LeConte, 1863 g
 Mycetoporus macrocephalus Bernhauer, 1917 g
 Mycetoporus maerkeli Kraatz, 1857 g
 Mycetoporus mediterraneus Bernhauer, 1917 g
 Mycetoporus montanus Luze, 1901 c g
 Mycetoporus monticola Fowler, 1888 g
 Mycetoporus mulsanti Ganglbauer, 1895 g
 Mycetoporus neotomae Fall, 1910 g b
 Mycetoporus nidicola Campbell, 1991 g
 Mycetoporus niger Fairmaire & Laboulbène, 1856 g
 Mycetoporus nigrans Méklin, 1853 g
 Mycetoporus nigricollis Stephens, 1835 g
 Mycetoporus oreophilus Bernhauer, 1900 g
 Mycetoporus pachyraphis Pandellé, 1869 c g
 Mycetoporus pacificus Campbell, 1991 g
 Mycetoporus piceolus Rey, 1882 g
 Mycetoporus pollinensis Scheerpeltz, 1956 g
 Mycetoporus portosanctanus Palm, 1980 g
 Mycetoporus punctipennis W.Scriba, 1868 g
 Mycetoporus quadrillum Fauvel, 1871 g
 Mycetoporus reichei (Pandellé, 1869) g
 Mycetoporus revelierei Rey, 1883 g
 Mycetoporus rondaensis Fagel, 1958 g
 Mycetoporus rufescens (Stephens, 1832) g
 Mycetoporus ruffoi Scheerpeltz, 1961 g
 Mycetoporus rufohumeralis Campbell, 1991 g
 Mycetoporus rugosus Hatch, 1957 g
 Mycetoporus smetanai Campbell, 1991 g
 Mycetoporus solidicornis Wollaston, 1864 g
 Mycetoporus tenuis Mulsant & Rey, 1853 g
 Mycetoporus triangulatus Campbell, 1991 g
 Mycetoporus wingelmuelleri Luze, 1901 g
 Mycetoporus wollastoni Fauvel, 1897 g
 Mycetoporus zeithammeri Bernhauer, 1902 g

Data sources: i = ITIS, c = Catalogue of Life, g = GBIF, b = Bugguide.net

References

Further reading

External links

 

Tachyporinae